Michelle Phillips is an American actress and singer whose career spans over five decades. She initially came to prominence as a vocalist in the group The Mamas and the Papas in 1965. She had her first major screen appearance in a minor role in Dennis Hopper's The Last Movie (1971) before being cast as Billie Frechette in the John Dillinger biopic Dillinger (1973), which earned her a Golden Globe Award nominations for Most Promising Newcomer. Phillips subsequently had leading roles in the television films The Death Squad and The California Kid (both 1974).

In 1977, she was cast as Natacha Rambova in the Rudolph Valentino biopic Valentino, directed by Ken Russell. Subsequent film roles included The Man with Bogart's Face (1980), and the nature horror film Savage Harvest (1981). Throughout the majority of the 1980s, Phillips worked prolifically in television, appearing in guest-starring roles on Fantasy Island and The Love Boat, as well as appearing in a number of television films, such as Murder Me, Murder You (1983) and Secrets of a Married Man (1984).

Beginning in 1987, Phillips portrayed Anne Matheson on the series Knots Landing, a role she continued until 1993. She subsequently provided the voice role of Raven on the short-lived Ralph Bakshi animated series Spicy City (1997), and appeared in several episodes of Beverly Hills, 90210 (1997–1998), playing Abby Malone, mother of Valerie Malone. In the 2000s, Phillips appeared in several independent films, including the comedy Jane White Is Sick & Twisted (2002) and the gay-themed drama Harry + Max (2004), and the comedy Kids in America (2005). Since the millennium, she has also appeared in a number of documentary films as an interview subject, including Feminists: What Were They Thinking? (2018) and Echo in the Canyon (2019).

Film

Television

References

Sources

Actress filmographies
American filmographies